The 2001 Amílcar Cabral Cup was held in Mali. The title was won by Senegal (U-23 Team).

Group stage

Group A

Group B

Knockout stage

Semi-finals

Third place match

Final

References
Details in RSSSF archives

Amílcar Cabral Cup